Wyoming National Forest was first established July 1, 1908 from part of Yellowstone National Forest with .  On May 14, 1923, the lands of the first Bridger National Forest were added, and on March 10, 1941, its name was changed to Bridger National Forest. In 1973 Bridger National Forest was administratively combined with Teton National Forest, creating Bridger-Teton National Forest.

References

External links
Forest History Society
Listing of the National Forests of the United States and Their Dates (from the Forest History Society website) Text from Davis, Richard C., ed. Encyclopedia of American Forest and Conservation History. New York: Macmillan Publishing Company for the Forest History Society, 1983. Vol. II, pp. 743-788.

Former National Forests of Wyoming